Kalappia is a genus of plants in the family Fabaceae. It belongs to the subfamily Dialioideae.

It contains the following species:
 Kalappia celebica

References

Dialioideae
Fabaceae genera
Taxonomy articles created by Polbot